is a science fiction manga series written and illustrated by Kou Yaginuma in 89 chapters. The series tells a coming-of-age story of high school students in the early 21st century training to participate in one of Japan's first human spaceflight missions. It centers around the lead character Asumi Kamogawa, whose decision to become an astronaut is influenced by a family tragedy and a mentor figure from her past.

These stories were serialized by Media Factory from the July 2000 issue (released June 5, 2000) of the seinen manga magazine Comic Flapper until June 5, 2002. The Asumi story arc sets the stage for Twin Spica by introducing figures from her childhood that will affect her growth at the fictional Tokyo Space Academy. The main story arc at the space academy was first serialized in the October 2001 issue (released September 5, 2001) of Comic Flapper. It continued until the publication of the 89th chapter on August 5, 2009. Both story arcs have been compiled into 16 bound volumes, with chapters of the Asumi story arc interspersed among several volumes. The series is licensed by Tong Li Publishing for Chinese-language release in Taiwan under the title Dream of Spica.

Following a three-week contract negotiation, New York City-based Vertical Inc announced on September 25, 2009, that it had acquired the license to publish Twin Spica in English. Vertical marketing director Ed Chavez explained that the motivation to acquire Twin Spica came about from the company's desire to license works from Japanese publishers that have yet to form a partnership with major American publishers. Chavez proposed that Vertical continued its previous partnership with Media Factory, a smaller publishing company from which Vertical licensed the Guin Saga manga in 2007. In assessing the series for possible licensing, Chavez, a fan of science fiction, found Twin Spica'''s story "technically sound" and noted it as "possibly one of the most heartfelt series I've read in ages". Vertical expected that the series would help broaden its reader base. Twin Spica would also introduce science fiction to readers in anticipation of future Vertical licenses of works by Osamu Tezuka and the Year 24 Group. While the series was originally published in a seinen'' magazine, Chavez expected that it would also appeal to fans of shōjo manga. Beginning with the seventh volume of the manga, the American publisher Vertical Inc started including more chapters in each volume compared to their Japanese counterparts. Volume 12, released in March 2012 is the final English volume, collecting together volumes 15 and 16 of the Japanese release.

Volume list

See also
List of Twin Spica episodes

References

External links
 Twin Spica e-books with chapter listing 
 

Twin Spica